Weka Pass is a locality in the northern Canterbury region of New Zealand's South Island between the towns of Waipara and Waikari.

The Waipara River cut the Weka Pass by wearing down the soft limestone and mudstone in the area. Erosion has created a number of distinctive limestone formations in the pass, which are known by descriptive names such as Frog Rock and The Seal. The Pass is home to various species of bird, including the weka, kaka, and kiwi, and was also home to the extinct moa.

Māori rock art can be found under a limestone overhang, and it is now the prime attraction of the Weka Pass Historic Park. Māori first explored the area approximately a millennium ago and used the limestone overhang for shelter. Early European explorers utilised the overhang for the same purpose.

State Highway 7 runs through the Weka Pass, and so does a railway line. This railway was established in 1882 and although originally intended to be part of the Main North Line from Christchurch to Nelson and Blenheim, the main line ultimately took a coastal route northwards from Waipara and the line through the Weka Pass became part of the Waiau Branch. This branch line operated until 15 January 1978, and the section through the Weka Pass has been saved by a preservation group, the Weka Pass Railway. It is now one of the premier restored/tourist railways in New Zealand.

References

External links 
 Official website of the Weka Pass Railway
 Department of Conservation: Weka Pass Historic Reserve
 Information about and photos of the railway through Weka Pass

Canyons and gorges of Canterbury, New Zealand
Hurunui District
Populated places in Canterbury, New Zealand